Mike Patterson may refer to:

 Mike Patterson (American football) (born 1983), American football defensive tackle
 Mike Patterson (baseball) (born 1958), former Major League Baseball outfielder
 Mike Patterson (footballer) (1941–2002), Australian rules footballer and coach
 Mike Patterson (transport director), director of the Oklahoma Department of Transportation

See also
 Mike Paterson, computer scientist
 Michael Patterson (disambiguation)